Miriam Margolyes  (born 18 May 1941) is a British-Australian actress, writer, political activist and television personality. She has gained prominence as a character actor on stage and screen. She received a BAFTA Award for Best Actress in a Supporting Role for her role in Martin Scorsese's The Age of Innocence (1993) and portrayed Professor Sprout in the Harry Potter film series (2002–2011). Margolyes was appointed Officer of the Order of the British Empire (OBE) in the 2002 New Year Honours for Services to Drama.

After starting her career in theatre, she made her film acting debut in the British comedy A Nice Girl Like Me (1969). She has since appeared in Reds (1981), Yentl (1982), Little Shop of Horrors (1986), Little Dorrit (1988), Romeo + Juliet (1996), and Being Julia (2004). She's also known for her voice roles in Babe (1995), James and the Giant Peach (1996), Mulan (1998), Happy Feet (2006), Flushed Away (2006), and Early Man (2018).

Margolyes is also known for her television appearances including in The Diddakoi (1976), Blackadder, Cold Comfort Farm (1995), Vanity Fair (1998), and The Life and Death of Peter Sellers (2004). She's also known for her recurring roles as Prudence Stanley in Australian series Miss Fisher's Murder Mysteries (2012-2015) and Sister Mildred in the BBC/PBS series Call the Midwife (2018-2021). She has starred in productions in both the United Kingdom and Australia, including her 1989 one-woman show Dickens' Women and the Australian premiere of the 2013 play, I'll Eat You Last. 

Margolyes has spent many years dividing her time between the United Kingdom, Australia and Italy. She became an Australian citizen in 2013. She has also written two books, Dickens' Women (2012) and her autobiography This Much is True (2021).

Early life
Margolyes was born in Oxford on 18 May 1941, the only child of Joseph Margolyes (1899–1995), a Scottish physician and general practitioner from the Gorbals area of Glasgow, and property-developer Ruth (née Sandman; 1905–1974), daughter of a second-hand furniture dealer and auctioneer at Kirkdale, Liverpool, who later relocated to London. The maternal family surname changed from Sandeman to Walters before Margolyes' birth. She grew up in a Jewish family, with ancestors who moved to the UK from Belarus and Poland. Her maternal great-grandfather, Symeon Sandmann, was born in the Polish town of Margonin, which Margolyes visited in 2013. Her grandfather Margolyes was born in a small shtetl called Amdur (now – Indura) in Belarus, which at that time was part of the Russian Empire.

Margolyes attended Oxford High School and Newnham College, Cambridge, where she read English. There, in her 20s, she began acting and appeared in productions by the Cambridge Footlights. She represented Newnham College in the first series of University Challenge, where she may have been one of the first people to say "fuck" on British television; she claims to have used the word in frustration on the show in 1963.

Career

With her versatile voice, Margolyes first gained recognition for her work as a voice artist. In the 1970s, she recorded a soft-porn audio called Sexy Sonia: Leaves from my Schoolgirl Notebook. She performed most of the supporting female characters in the dubbed Japanese action TV series Monkey. She also worked with the theatre company Gay Sweatshop and provided voiceovers in the Japanese TV series The Water Margin (credited as Mirium Margolyes).

In 1974, she appeared with Kenneth Williams and Ted Ray in the BBC Radio 2 comedy series The Betty Witherspoon Show.

Margolyes's first major role in a film was as Elephant Ethel in Stand Up, Virgin Soldiers (1977). In the 1980s, she made appearances in Blackadder opposite Rowan Atkinson: these roles include the Spanish Infanta in The Black Adder, Lady Whiteadder in Blackadder II and Queen Victoria in Blackadder's Christmas Carol. In 1986, she played a major supporting role in the BBC drama The Life and Loves of a She-Devil. She won the 1989 LA Critics Circle Award for Best Supporting Actress for her portrayal of Flora Finching in the film Little Dorrit (1988). On American television, she headlined the short-lived 1992 CBS sitcom Frannie's Turn. In 1994, she won the BAFTA Award for Best Supporting Actress for her role as Mrs Mingott in Martin Scorsese's The Age of Innocence (1993).

In 1989, Margolyes co-wrote and performed a one-woman show, Dickens' Women, in which she played 23 characters from Dickens' novels. In 2005 Margolyes hosted a ten-part BBC Four documentary, Dickens in America, which retraced Dickens's 1842 journey across the United States of America. 

Margolyes played Aunt Sponge and voiced the Glow-Worm in James and the Giant Peach (1996). She played the Nurse in Baz Luhrmann's Romeo + Juliet (1996). She voiced the rabbit character in the animated commercials for Cadbury's Caramel bars and provided the voice of Fly the dog in the Australian-American family film Babe (1995).

She played Professor Sprout in Harry Potter and the Chamber of Secrets released in 2002.  She reprised her role as Professor Sprout in Harry Potter and the Deathly Hallows – Part 2 (2011). In a 2011 interview on The Graham Norton Show, in regard to her Potter costars, Margolyes said that she got on well with Maggie Smith, but rather bluntly admitted that she, "didn't like the one that died", referring to Richard Harris.

In 2004, Margolyes played the role of Peg Sellers, the mother of Peter Sellers, in the Golden Globe winning film The Life and Death of Peter Sellers.

Margolyes was one of the original cast of the London production of the musical Wicked opposite Idina Menzel in 2006, playing Madame Morrible, a role she played again on Broadway in 2008.

In 2009, she appeared in a new production of Endgame by Samuel Beckett at the Duchess Theatre in the West End.

Margolyes voiced the role of Mrs. Plithiver, a blind snake, in the 3D-animated-epic film Legend of the Guardians: The Owls of Ga'Hoole (2010).

In 2011, Margolyes recorded a narrative for the album The Devil's Brides by klezmer musician-ethnographer Yale Strom.

Margolyes played recurring character Prudence Stanley in the Australian-based TV series Miss Fisher's Murder Mysteries from 2012 to 2015.

In 2014, she voiced Nana in the Disney Junior animated series Nina Needs to Go!

In January 2016, Margolyes appeared in The Real Marigold Hotel, a travel documentary in which a group of eight celebrities traveled to India to see whether retirement would be more rewarding there than in the UK. The series was reprised for two Christmas Specials The Real Marigold On Tour, from Florida and Kyoto. She narrated the 2016 ITV documentary about Lady Colin Campbell entitled Lady C and the Castle.

In December 2017, Margolyes appeared in the second season of The Real Marigold On Tour to Chengdu and Havana. She appeared in the first episode of the third series, in which she traveled to St Petersburg with Bobby George, Sheila Ferguson and Stanley Johnson.

In January 2018, Margolyes hosted a three-part series for the BBC titled Miriam's Big American Adventure, highlighting the citizens of the United States and the issues facing the country. She voiced Queen Oofeefa in the film Early Man.

Since 2018, Margolyes has portrayed Mother Mildred in the BBC One drama, Call The Midwife.

She played Miss Shepherd in a 2019 production of The Lady in the Van for the Melbourne Theatre Company in Melbourne in Australia.

In 2021, she played Lillian opposite Helen Monks in the BBC Radio 4 sitcom Charlotte and Lillian, where she introduced her autobiography This Much Is True. On 5 November 2021 she appeared on BBC One's The Graham Norton Show, where she introduced her autobiography This Much Is True, explaining that it was written only because she "was paid an enormous amount of money". On 16 September 2021, Margolyes released This Much Is True through Hachette Books.

In April 2022, Margolyes was the subject of the BBC documentary Miriam Margolyes: Up for Grabs in the Imagine... series, where she was interviewed by Alan Yentob.

In November 2022 it was revealed Margolyes had been signed up to appear in the Doctor Who 60th anniversary special.

She appeared on BBC Radio 4's The Museum of Curiosity in February 2023. Her hypothetical donation to this imaginary museum was "Charles Dickens and all his works".

Personal life
Margolyes is a lesbian. On becoming an Australian citizen on Australia Day 2013, she referred to herself as a "dyke" live on national television and in front of the then Prime Minister, Julia Gillard. Since 1968, she has been in a relationship with Heather Sutherland, a now-retired Australian professor of Indonesian studies. They divide their time between homes in London and Kent in England, Robertson in Australia, and Montisi in Italy.

Margolyes is a Patron of My Death My Decision, an organisation in the UK which seeks a more compassionate approach to dying, including the legal right to a medically assisted death, if that is a person's persistent wish.

Margolyes is a supporter of Sense (the National Deafblind and Rubella Association) and was the host at the first Sense Creative Writing Awards, held at the Charles Dickens Museum in London in December 2006, where she read a number of works written by talented deafblind people.

Political activism 
Margolyes' political activism started at university. "I came from a very middle-class Jewish background, always Tory-voting", she later said. However, in the 1970s, she joined the Workers Revolutionary Party with other actors and Equity members such as Vanessa Redgrave, Frances de la Tour and Tom Kempinski. She is a signatory of Jews for Justice for Palestinians. Margolyes said, "What I want to try to do is to get Jewish people to understand what's really going on, and they don't want to hear it. If you speak to most Jews and say, 'Can Israel ever be in the wrong?' they say, 'No. Our duty as Jews is to support Israel whatever happens.' And I don't believe that. It is our duty as human beings to report the truth as we see it." She is also a campaigner for the respite care charity Crossroads.

Margolyes is a member of the Labour Party and is registered to vote in Vauxhall. In August 2015, she was a signatory to a letter criticising The Jewish Chronicles reporting of Labour leader Jeremy Corbyn's alleged associations with antisemites. In November 2019, she endorsed the Labour Party in the UK general election because of their policies on the National Health Service. Later in the month, along with other public figures, she signed a letter supporting Corbyn and describing him as a "beacon of hope in the struggle against emergent far-right nationalism, xenophobia, and racism in much of the democratic world".

Margolyes was very critical of the British Government's handling of the coronavirus pandemic. She considered that it was "a public scandal" and "a disgrace."  With the Prime Minister hospitalised suffering from COVID-19, Margolyes said "I had difficulty not wanting Boris Johnson to die."

On 15 October 2022, after being interviewed by Justin Webb about the recently deceased Robbie Coltrane on BBC Radio 4's Today, she commented to the presenters that she had never expected to be in a seat that had just been vacated by the Chancellor of the Exchequer, Jeremy Hunt. She said, live on air, "When I saw him there I just said, 'You've got a hell of a job, the best of luck', and what I really wanted to say was 'Fuck you, you bastard!'"

In popular culture
Author and comedian David Walliams says he used Margolyes as a model for the title character in his children's book Awful Auntie after an argument with her during a stage production, though he stressed that he has nothing against her and is a fan of her work.

Filmography

Film

Television

Non-fiction television 

Notes
The Thief and the Cobbler (1993) – the voice of the Maiden from Mombasa (original version only; the character was not heard at all in the re-edited versions and another actor was never available in all the re-edited versions)
The Life and Death of Peter Sellers (2004) – Peg Sellers – note this film was shown in cinemas in the UK, Ireland, and Australia – it aired on cable television on the HBO network in the US.

Stage

Awards and nominations

Margolyes was appointed Officer of the Order of the British Empire (OBE) in the 2002 New Year Honours for Services to Drama.

Notes

References

External links

Dickens' Women tour site
Miriam Margolyes at Women in Comedy

1941 births
Living people
20th-century English actresses
21st-century English actresses
20th-century LGBT people
21st-century LGBT people
Actors from Oxford
Actresses from Oxfordshire
Alumni of Newnham College, Cambridge
Anti-Zionist Jews
Audiobook narrators
Australian lesbian actresses
Australian Officers of the Order of the British Empire
Australian people of Belarusian-Jewish descent
Australian people of British-Jewish descent
Australian people of Polish-Jewish descent
Australian people of Scottish descent
Best Supporting Actress BAFTA Award winners
Contestants on University Challenge
English emigrants to Australia
English film actresses
English lesbian actresses
English people of Belarusian-Jewish descent
English people of Polish-Jewish descent
English people of Scottish descent
English radio actresses
English Shakespearean actresses
English stage actresses
English television actresses
English voice actresses
Jewish anti-Zionism
Jewish Australian actresses
Jewish English actresses
Labour Party (UK) people
English LGBT actors
Naturalised citizens of Australia
People educated at Oxford High School, England
Australian expatriates in England
LGBT Jews